CKLQ-FM (Q Country 91.5 FM) is a commercial FM radio station in Brandon, Manitoba, Canada. In addition to its FM signal, it has a nested rebroadcaster at 880 kHz, CKLQ. The two stations simulcast a country format. They are owned and operated by Westman Radio Ltd., a subsidiary of the Westman Communications Group. CKLQ-AM-FM, along with sister station CKLF-FM, have their radio studios and offices at 624 14th Street East, on Brandon's northeast side.

CKLQ-FM has an effective radiated power (ERP) of 100,000 watts, the current maximum for Canadian FM stations. CKLQ 880 is powered at 10,000 watts, day and night. AM 880 is a clear channel frequency reserved for Class A WCBS New York City. So CKLQ has a directional signal at all times. At night, when radio waves travel farther, it uses a four-tower array to prevent interference to WCBS.

History
CKLQ started broadcasting in October 1977 at a frequency of 1570 kHz and moved to its 880 frequency in 1985.

On January 6, 2016, the CRTC approved Riding Mountain's application to convert CKLQ to 91.5 MHz with an effective radiated power of 100,000 watts (non-directional antenna with an effective height of antenna above average terrain of 325.6 metres). Riding Mountain also received approval for an AM rebroadcasting transmitter which would operate on CKLQ's current frequency and technical parameters, at 880 kHz (class B) with a daytime and nighttime transmitter power of 10,000 watts.

CKLQ-FM signed on the air on Thursday, April 27, 2017, at 4:15 p.m., rebranding as Q Country 91.5 FM.

In September 2022, Westman announced the sale of CKLQ and CKLF to Pattison Media.

References

External links
Q Country 91.5 FM
 

CKLQ on Radio-Locator
Alternate Live Stream Link

Klq
Klq
Radio stations established in 1977
1977 establishments in Manitoba